Romantic Mode (stylized as ROMANTIC MODE) was a Japanese pop group that debuted in 1996 with their first single, "Dreams." The members are Akira Asakura (vocals), Masaki Suzukawa (guitars/keyboards), and Joe Rinoie (keyboards/backup vocals).

Their style is electronic pop.

Two of their songs, "DREAMS" and "Resolution," were used in the anime After War Gundam X as the first and second opening songs, respectively.

The group broke up soon after their last album was released in 1999.  However, Akira Asakura continued as a solo artist initially under her birthname, Saori Saitoh, but reverted to her stagename in 2005.

Discography

Singles 
22 March 1996: DREAMS
23 October 1996: Resolution
21 February 1997: LIBERTY
21 March 1997: Love Is The Destiny
21 August 1997: Eien ga Owaru made Atsui KISS wo Shiyō (永遠が終わるまで熱いKISSをしよう)
21 February 1998: Runner

Albums
21 August 1996: ROmantic Mode 
21 December 1996: Vision of Love
22 October 1997: Dimensions
25 March 1999: romantic pleasures

Japanese pop music groups
Japanese electropop groups
Musical groups established in 1995
Musical groups disestablished in 1999